Chick Flick is a 2022 Indian Bengali language crime and comedy web series directed by Joydip Banerjee and written by Soumit Deb.

The web series starring Sudipa Basu, Debraj Bhattacharya, Saoli Chattopadhyay, Kharaj Mukherjee, Anujoy Chattopadhyay, Sabuj Bardhan, Palash Haque, Jina Tarafdar, Sayan Ghosh and Poulomi Das are in the lead roles. The first season was released on 6 December 2019 on Klikk.

Synopsis

Season 1 
The Great Indian diamond is being smuggled by Medusa, a crime lord, and is being concealed in a toy chicken that is lost in the process. Three strangers, Tanay, Bumpy, and Montu, are unwittingly sucked into this sinister network of criminal activity. To find the lost toy, Medusa has them work together. They are assisted in their cat-and-mouse game by Zinia and Sweety. In addition, ACP Duronto is on a quest to capture Medusa, and Bisorgo, the all-powerful don, stalks Medusa nonstop. The narrative is an exhilarating roller coaster ride full with odd comedy, vivid characters, intense action, and tantalising turns.

Season 2 
The "troika" of Tanay, Bumpy, and Montu are back, along with Jinia, as they set off on a quest to discover the recipe for a recently discovered enigmatic chemical code-named "Amrita." Along with drug kingpin Jethu and the head of a betting syndicate, Mastani, their arch-enemy Medusa is also present. As the hunt for "Amrita" intensifies in season two, the enjoyment is increased thrice.

Cast 
Debraj Bhattacharya as Goja
Sudipa Basu as Medusa
Saoli Chattopadhyay as Jinia
Anujoy Chattopadhyay as Tanay
Sabuj Bardhan as Montu
Palash Haque as Limca
Sayan Ghosh as Bumpy
Kharaj Mukherjee as Jethu
Jina Tarafdar as Bimboboti
Krishnendu Dewanji as Inspector Batabyal
Ratasree Dutta as Mastani
Poushmita Goswami as CP
Durbar Sharma as Anko Honours
Poulomi Das as Sweety
Prasenjit Bardhan as Nawab

Season 1

Season 2

Soundtrack 
The music of the series is composed by Nilanjan Ghosh. The singers are Nilanjan Ghosh, Moon Batabyal and Reya Kundu.

References

External links 
 

Bengali-language web series
2020 films
Indian crime films
Indian comedy films
2019 films